Conejo is an unincorporated community and census-designated place (CDP) in Santa Fe County, New Mexico, United States. It was first listed as a CDP prior to the 2020 census.

The CDP is north of the geographic center of the county and is bordered to the north by the city of Santa Fe, the state capital, to the east by Santa Fe Foothills, to the southeast by Sunlit Hills, and to the south by Arroyo Hondo.

Interstate 25 forms the northern and eastern borders of the CDP, with access from Exit 282 (U.S. Routes 84 and 285 / South Saint Francis Drive) and Exit 284 (New Mexico State Road 466 / Old Pecos Trail).

Demographics

Education
It is within Santa Fe Public Schools.

References 

Census-designated places in Santa Fe County, New Mexico
Census-designated places in New Mexico